Andrea McDonnell (born 7 July 1960) is an Australian Paralympic table tennis player. She competed for Australia at the 2016 Rio Paralympics.

Personal
McDonnell was born on 7 July 1960. She grew up in Townsville, Queensland and is one of six children. A workplace accident left her with impaired movement in her left leg and right arm. In 2016, she lives in Ayr, Queensland and works as a financial planner.

Table tennis

She is a Class 10 table tennis player. McDonnell grew up in a table tennis family with both her parents playing. She was a national junior player. She took up table tennis again after her accident. She made her debut for Australia at the  2013 Oceania Para Table Tennis Championships in Canberra.  At the 2015  Oceania Para Table Tennis Championships in Bendigo, she was defeated by Melissa Tapper in the Class 6–10 final.

At the 2016 Rio Paralympics, McDonnell did not win a match in the Women's Singles Class 10 preliminaries and did not advance. In the Women's Doubles Class 6–10, McDonnell and her partner Melissa Tapper finished fourth.

She has coached her two of her nieces at junior national level.

References

External links
  (archive)
 

1960 births
Living people
Paralympic table tennis players of Australia
Table tennis players at the 2016 Summer Paralympics
Commonwealth Games medallists in table tennis
Commonwealth Games bronze medallists for Australia
Table tennis players at the 2018 Commonwealth Games
Sportspeople from Townsville
Sportswomen from Queensland
Medallists at the 2018 Commonwealth Games